Alireza Mokhtari (born October 24, 1977) is an Iranian Paralympic athlete. He represented Iran at the 2020 Summer Paralympics in Tokyo, Japan and won the silver medal in the Men's shot put F53 event.

References

External links 
 

1977 births
Living people
Sportspeople from Isfahan
Iranian male shot putters
Paralympic athletes of Iran
Medalists at the 2020 Summer Paralympics
Athletes (track and field) at the 2020 Summer Paralympics
Paralympic silver medalists for Iran
Paralympic medalists in athletics (track and field)
21st-century Iranian people
Wheelchair shot putters
Paralympic shot putters
Medalists at the 2014 Asian Para Games
Medalists at the 2018 Asian Para Games